Elizabeth Montgomery may refer to:
Elizabeth Montgomery (1933–1995), American actress
Elizabeth Montgomery (designer) (1902–1993), English theatre and costume designer
Elisabeth P. Montgomery (born 1942), American author and film producer